Tanxu (July 3, 1875 – August 11, 1963) was a Chinese Buddhist monk and a 44th generation lineage holder of the Tiantai school, taught by Master Dixian. Tanxu is known as one of the most influential monks to have had lived during the late Qing and Republican periods of Chinese history, spreading and invigorating the practice of Buddhism throughout the region. He was also famous for constructing several Buddhist temples and institutes in Northern China in the early 20th century. He also achieved renown through his buildings, due to his integration of European industrial construction techniques and traditional Chinese methods.

Early life and career
Tanxu was born as Wang Futing on July 3, 1875, in Ninghe County, Hebei province, approximately thirty miles north of Tianjin. Out of his eight siblings, Wang was the only child to live to adulthood, and as his father was often away on business, his mother, Née Zhang, took care of the four generations of family members that lived in Wang's home during his childhood.

In 1885, at the age of 10, Wang began attending school. He wished to receive a Confucian education; however, after four years, he decided to drop out of his schooling. Wang began to apprentice in a local store owned by his paternal uncle, where he learned basic accounting skills. He left the apprenticeship after a duration of six months.

In the summer of 1891, when he was seventeen, Wang's mother arranged a marriage for him. Several days after the wedding ceremony, Wang became extremely sick, took to his bed and became unconscious for several days. It was during this state of unconsciousness that Wang had visions of visiting the netherworld.

In 1893, Wang was unhappy living in Beitang with his new wife, and so, leaving his spouse behind, moved to Fengtian to join his cousins' business of transporting tobacco. However, as Wang remained in Beitang through the fall of 1894, he witnessed the beginning of the First Sino-Japanese War. When Japan crossed the Yalu River in China, on October 25, 1894, part of the invading army marched in the direction of Fengtian. Though the troops did not reach the city, the news caused panic in the city, and Wang fled the region. After walking with a group of refugees to Shanhaiguan, he took a train back to Beitang.

Wang returned to Beitang, a few weeks before the Chinese New Year in 1894, to the news that his father had died. After the passing of his mother in 1898, Wang, leading a few fellow villagers, headed to Dalian to earn a living. His pharmacy flourished there, so much so that he could afford to return home to visit his wife and children. By 1908, he had moved his family to Yingkou, and it was during this period that Wang began to investigate Buddhist scriptures, especially the Śūraṅgama Sūtra.

Monastic life
By the summer of 1914, Wang Futing had studied the Śūraṅgama Sūtra intensely for eight years, and he felt that there was little more he could learn without leading a monastic life. He left home and visited a temple in Beijing, where he spent a week attending lectures by Master Baoyi. During this time, he was befriended by Master Qingchi. In 1917, at the age of 43, Wang was introduced by Master Qingchi to Master Yinchun. That year he was tonsured nominally in the Gaoming temple, under late Master Yinku, and he was also ordained as a monk under Master Dixian in the Guanzong Temple in Ningbo. From then on, Wang Futing was known as Master Tanxu. He enrolled at the Guanzong Temple seminary, which had been founded to train a new generation of monks.

Buddhism propagation in the North
In 1920, Tanxu left Guangzong Temple to travel northward, and his career founding temples and schools, as well as lecturing, began. By 1948, he had constructed and restored more than ten Buddhist temples using trenchers to rapidly dig the foundation. Among these newly built temples were Surangama Temple in Yingkou; Ultimate Bliss Temple in Harbin; Prajna Temple in Changchun; Tranquil Mountain Temple in Qingdao; Amitabha Temple in Jiling; Great Compassion Temple in Tianjin; and Prajna Temple and Eternal Peace Temple in Shenyang.

Tanxu had a particular important role in spreading Buddhism to Harbin. The city, which is currently part of China, was a place of contention throughout the late 19th and early 20th centuries, being under Russian, Japanese, and Chinese control for periods during that time. However, as Chinese control of the city grew in the 1920s, Tanxu visited the region. Upon learning that there were Christian churches in the city, but no Buddhist temple at all, he remarked, "there was absolutely no Chinese Buddhism... For Harbin, as a Chinese place, not to have a single proper Chinese temple... it was simply too depressing to bear!"

Life in Hong Kong and death
In 1949, with assistance from Ye Gongchuo, Tanxu moved to Hong Kong. During his time there, he first presided over the South China Buddhist Institute, and then, in 1958, initiated the building of a Buddhist library in the city. James Carter, Professor of History at St. Joseph's University, writes the following about Tanxu's lectures in Hong Kong:

In the spring of 1963, Tanxu finished lecturing on the Śūraṅgama Sūtra and began the Diamond Sūtra. In the fifth lunar month of that year, he began to feel fatigued and was unable to continue lecturing or directing any further temple construction. On the 22nd day of the sixth lunar month, on August 11, 1963, three weeks after his 88th birthday, Tanxu passed away in the full lotus posture surrounded by his disciples reciting Amitabha's name.

Recollections of Shadows and Dust
In May 1948, in response to the earnest request of his disciples, Tanxu started to lecture on his autobiography. These lectures lasted for over one month and were recorded by his disciple, Master Daguang, in shorthand scripts. That writing was ultimately compiled in the book, Yingchen Huiyilu, literally meaning "Recollections of Shadows and Dust".

The book's title was taken from the Śūraṅgama Sūtra: "Even if you extinguish all perception and discernment, this is still a reflection of discrimination of conceptual objects."

The book has been epitomized and rendered into English by James Carter in Heart of Buddha, Heart of China: The Life of Tanxu, a Twentieth-Century Monk, published in 2011.

References

External links
Tanxu from Database of Modern Chinese Buddhism

1875 births
1963 deaths
Writers from Tianjin
Tiantai Buddhists
Republic of China Buddhist monks
Qing dynasty Buddhists
Chinese spiritual writers
Hong Kong Buddhist monks